Arctic Antics is a Silly Symphonies animated Disney short film. It was released on June 26, 1930.

The director of the short is uncertain. Ub Iwerks' name is on the draft, but Iwerks had left the Walt Disney Studio four months before the animators started producing the cartoon. In Walt Disney's Silly Symphonies: A Companion to the Classic Cartoon Series, Russell Merritt and J.B. Kaufman say that it's "likely, but uncertain" that Burt Gillett directed the short, adding, "Circumstantial evidence points to Gillett as the director. After Iwerks left, Gillett directed all but one of the subsequent 1930 Silly Symphonies. Further, the scenes of the singing walrus and the applauding seals are lifted directly from Wild Waves, a Mickey Mouse short directed by Gillett in late 1929.

Summary 
In the Arctic, animals have fun dancing: The short film begins with a small anthropomorphic bear dancing on a polar bear in the sea. Every time the polar bear comes across a piece of ice, it dives under the sea and the anthropomorphised bear jumps onto the piece of ice. After leaving it behind, the anthropomorphic bear returns to the bear's back, although he  ends up swallowing the bear's tail. Many other polar bears and some walruses also dance on pieces of ice. A walrus tries to catch a naughty fish on the Pole, while many other walruses dance. A seal puts on a show with a fish (which it ends up eaten) around its companions, who admire the spectacle. After this, the seal "plays" with the aforementioned walrus. The seal makes music with the walrus' beams and tusks, but the walrus scares it away. The walrus plays a character in front of the seals. A group of penguins dance in a straight line, and walk in single file, two by two.

Reception
The Film Daily (September 21, 1930): "Swell cartoon entertainment is this Walt Disney subject, one of the Silly Symphony series. Delightfully goofy stuff. Against an Arctic background, cartooned native animals go through the gestures of singing and dancing. The characters move in synchronism with the music. It's packed with laughs for everybody from six to sixty, and then some."

Variety (June 30, 1931): "As good as any in this series, which is pretty good. Drawing and synchronization carefully done with none of the hackneyed tricks which spoil so many cartoon shorts. Parade of penguins to the tune of "The Wooden Soldier" is a sure laugh anywhere with a dance by the seals not far behind."

Home media
The short was released on December 19, 2006, on Walt Disney Treasures: More Silly Symphonies, Volume Two.

References

External links
 

1930 films
1930 short films
1930s Disney animated short films
Silly Symphonies
Films directed by Ub Iwerks
Films produced by Walt Disney
1930 animated films
American black-and-white films
Columbia Pictures animated short films
Films set in the Arctic
Columbia Pictures short films
Animated films without speech
American animated short films
1930s American films